Techspressionism is an artistic approach in which technology is utilized as a means to express emotional experience. It can also refer to a 21st-century artistic and social movement.

History of the term 

The term Techspressionism was first used by artist Colin Goldberg in 2011 as the title of a solo exhibition at 4 North Main Gallery in Southampton, New York. The catalog essay for the exhibition was written by art historian Helen Harrison, Director of the Pollock-Krasner House and Study Center.

Techspressionism was first referred to as a movement in WIRED in 2014.  The article referenced the first iteration of the Techspressionist Manifesto, which included an initial definition of the term Techspressionism, an amalgam of the Oxford English Dictionary definitions of Expressionism and technology.

The relationship between Techspressionism and Japanese aesthetics was explored by artist and writer Eric Ernst, grandson of surrealist painter Max Ernst and son of abstract expressionist artist Jimmy Ernst.

In 2015, the term Techspressionism was first used on television on the PBS show Art Loft.

Artist Oz Van Rosen used the term Techspressionism in a 2018 interview to describe her work in relation to glitch art. She used the term independently and defined it differently, linking it more specifically to digitally manipulated photography.

In 2020, Goldberg reached our to Van Rosen to see if she might have interest in starting an artist group around Techspressionism. In September 2020, Goldberg and Van Rosen met on Zoom with fellow artists Patrick Lichty, Steve Miller, and art historian Helen Harrison. During that meeting, they decided upon the definition of Techspressionism as "an artistic approach in which technology is utilized as a means to express emotional experience." Notably, it was Harrison’s suggestion to define Techspressionism as an approach rather than a style.

Artist group 

Harrison, who became an advisor to the group after the initial meeting, suggested that an exhibition be organized with as a way to develop an artist group around the concept.

A website was created and the use of the hashtag #techspressionism on Instagram became the primary way that the idea began to proliferate globally, with over 40,000 Instagram posts using the hashtag as of April 2022.

Artists began to meet regularly in online Salons, which were inspired by the Surrealist Salons of the past. Artist Davonte Bradley, who became the moderator of many of the early Salons suggested that they be recorded and published to YouTube.

In addition to the Salons, the group began to record and publish artist interviews. Inspired by Andy Warhol’s Interview Magazine, in which artists interviewed other artists, this initiative was designed and spearheaded by artist Roz Dimon.

Exhibitions 
Initially, a number of web-based exhibitions were organized by the group, including NFT Now, an early NFT exhibition curated by artist Anne Spalter, which opened online in May 2021.

the first physical exhibition of Techspressionist artworks,Techspressionism: Digital and Beyond opened at Southampton Arts Center on April 21, 2022.

The show included the works of Techspressionist artists from over 90 artists from more than 20 countries, including Afghanistan, Australia, Belgium, Brazil, Canada, Canary Islands, Czech Republic, France, Germany, Hong Kong, India, Iran, Italy, Netherlands, Peru, Puerto Rico, Russia, Taiwan, Turkey, Uganda, Ukraine and the United States.

Notable Techspressionists 
Notable Artists exhibited in Techspressionism: Digital and Beyond include:
 Victor Acevedo
 Suzanne Anker
 Joseph Nechvatal
 Frank Gillette
 Clive Holden
 Patrick Lichty
 Chalda Maloff
 Steve Miller
 DJ Spooky
 Michael Rees
 Christine Sciulli
 Nina Sobell
 Anne Morgan Spalter
 Nina Yankowitz

References

External links

Techspressionism: Curators in Conversation with Christiane Paul and Helen A. Harrison, October 9, 2022 
Art in Focus: What the Heck is Techspressionism? Stony Brook University Libraries, May 17, 2022
 Techspressionism: Digital and Beyond at Southampton Arts Center
 Techspressionism x The Wrong Biennale: Artist Interviews
 Techspressionism 2021 Online Exhibition
 NFT Now Online Exhibition
 Techspressionist Visual Artist Index
 Techspressionist Manifesto

Art movements
Social movements
Visual arts genres
Artistic techniques
Computer art
Digital art
New media art
New media